The First East Branch Magalloway River is a  river in northwestern Maine. It is a tributary of the Magalloway River, which flows to the Androscoggin River and ultimately to the tidal Kennebec River and the Atlantic Ocean.

See also
List of rivers of Maine

References

Maine Streamflow Data from the USGS
Maine Watershed Data From Environmental Protection Agency

Tributaries of the Kennebec River
Rivers of Maine
Rivers of Oxford County, Maine